Boris Paykin (born 26 March 1965, Leningrad) is a Russian political figure and a deputy of the 8th State Duma.
 
Starting from the end of the 1980s, Paykin engaged in business. In the mid-1990s, Paykin worked on a voluntary basis as an adviser to the First Deputy of the Governor of Saint Petersburg, Vladimir Yakovlev. From 1996 to 1997, he headed the Petrogradsky District of Saint Petersburg. In 1997, he became the president of the Associations of small and medium businesses of St. Petersburg. In 2006, he headed the Experimental Machine-Building Plant named after. V. M. Myasishcheva. In 2013, Paykin became the president of the FC Tosno. In 2016, he joined the Liberal Democratic Party of Russia. On 10 December 2017 Paykin was elected deputy of the 7th State Duma. Since September 2021, he has served as deputy of the 8th State Duma.

References
 

 

1965 births
Living people
Liberal Democratic Party of Russia politicians
21st-century Russian politicians
Eighth convocation members of the State Duma (Russian Federation)
Seventh convocation members of the State Duma (Russian Federation)
Politicians from Saint Petersburg